Charles Molette (1918–2013) was a French Roman Catholic priest and archivist. He won five prizes from the Académie française: the Prix Montyon for L’Association catholique de la jeunesse française in 1969; the Prix du cardinal Grente for Albert de Mun in 1971; the Prix Lafontaine for Un chemin de feu (Mère Laurentia Sibien, 1891-1943) in 1980; the Prix Véga et Lods de Wegmann for La vérité où je la trouve : Mulla Zadé in 1989; and the Prix du cardinal Grente for the entirety of his work in 1993.

References

1918 births
2013 deaths
20th-century French Roman Catholic priests
French archivists